Johannes (Hans) Gottfried Hallier (6 July 1868 – 10 March 1932) was a German botanist born in Jena.

He studied botany and zoology at the University of Jena under Christian Ernst Stahl (1848–1919) and Ernst Haeckel (1834–1919), and continued his studies at the University of Munich under Ludwig Radlkofer (1829–1927) and Richard Hertwig (1850–1937). From 1893 until 1897, he was based at the Buitenzorg Botanical Garden in Java.

In 1894, Hallier became the second European to climb Mount Kelam (after a certain Dr. Gürtler) and the first to collect specimens of the pitcher plant Nepenthes clipeata. He ascended the summit 5 times in January and February of that year. After his return to Germany, he served as an assistant in the Botanical Institute at the University of Munich. Beginning in 1898 Hallier worked at the Botanical Museum in Hamburg.

From 1903 to 1904 he took part in a scientific expedition to India, Ceylon and Maritime Southeast Asia. From 1908 to 1922, Hallier was a curator at the Rijksherbarium in Leiden.

He died on 10 March 1932 in Oegstgeest, Netherlands.

He is credited for introducing a phylogenetic classification of flowering plants that became known as the "Hallier system". He published several works on the botany of the Dutch East Indies (now Indonesia), including treatises on the flora of Borneo.

Hallier is commemorated in the scientific name of a species of lizard, Tytthoscincus hallieri.

Selected writings
Indonesische Acanthaceen, 1897 - Acanthaceae native to Indonesia. (in German).
Die indonesischen Aeschynanthusarten des Herbariums zu Buitenzorg, 1897 - Indonesian Aeschynanthus types from the Buitenzorg herbaria. (in German).
Zur Convolvulaceenflora Amerika's, 1899 - American Convolvulaceae. (in German).
Neue Vorschläge zur botanischen Nomenklatur, 1905 - New proposal involving botanical nomenclature. (in German).

References

Bibliography 

 (in French).
Hallier H (1893). "Versuch einer natürlichen Gleiderung der Convolvulaceen auf morphologischer und anatomischer Grundlage". Botanische Jahrbücher für Systematik, Pflanzengeschichte und Pflanzgeographie 16: 453–591. (in German).

Source
Parts of this article are based on a translation of an equivalent article at the German Wikipedia.

External links 
 IPNI List of plants described & co-described by Hallier.

1868 births
1932 deaths
Scientists from Jena
People from Saxe-Weimar-Eisenach
19th-century German botanists
20th-century German botanists